Fu Yan may refer to:

Fu Yan (politician), a Chinese politician
Fu Yan (constituency), a constituency of Yuen Long District Council in Hong Kong